The 1989 24 Hours of Le Mans was the 57th Grand Prix of Endurance, and took place on 10 and 11 June 1989.

Race
The race was the last time the 24 Hours of Le Mans ran without the two chicanes on the Mulsanne Straight; for the interest of safety to reduce speeds after speeds reaching  in the previous years and this race, these chicanes were installed the next year and remains in use. The speeds on the Mulsanne Straight were so high that many of the drivers were concerned if their cars would stay on the ground over the humps and bumps of the straight. There were no serious accidents, something Le Mans in the 1980s had many of.

Having run his cars at Le Mans for a decade, Peter Sauber was aided by Mercedes in winning the 1989 race. His "Silver Arrows" Sauber C9s finished 1st, 2nd and 5th, with Porsches and Jaguars finishing behind.

Qualifying
Class leaders are in bold

Several factory teams used the lengthy qualifying periods as a shakedown for their T-cars, and set some competitive lap times in the process. The #38 Toyota T-car actually set the 2nd fastest qualifying time overall, but the team chose to stick with their main car for the race itself, meaning they forfeited the T-car lap time and started 25th.

Official results
Class winners in bold.  Cars failing to complete 70% of the winner's distance marked as Not Classified (NC).

Statistics
 Pole Position - Jean-Louis Schlesser, #62 Team Sauber Mercedes - 3:15.040 (155.234 mph/249.826 km/h)
 Fastest Lap - Alain Ferté, #4 Silk Cut Jaguar - 3:21.093
 Distance - 5265.115 km
 Average Speed - 219.990 km/h
 Highest Trap Speed - Jaguar XJR-9 - 241.713 mph (389 km/h) (race), Sauber Mercedes C9 - 249.13 mph (401 km/h) (qualifying)

24 Hours of Le Mans races
Le Mans
24 Hours of Le Mans